David George Irwin (born 1 February 1959) is a former rugby union player who played for  and the British Lions.

Ireland
Helped Ireland win the 1982 Five Nations Championship and a Triple Crown.

British Lions
In 1983 Irwin was also a member of the Lions squad that went on tour to New Zealand.

Later years
Irwin is currently the medical coordinator for Ulster Rugby, as well as being a practising GP in Belfast.

References

External links
 

1959 births
Living people
Rugby union players from Belfast
Irish rugby union players
Ireland international rugby union players
Ulster Rugby players
Queen's University RFC players
Instonians rugby union players
British & Irish Lions rugby union players from Ireland
Car bomb victims
20th-century Irish medical doctors
21st-century Irish medical doctors
Sportsmen from Northern Ireland
Rugby union centres